Zululand is one of the 11 district municipalities ("districts") of KwaZulu-Natal province. The seat of Zululand is Ulundi. The majority of its 803,575 people speak IsiZulu (2011 Census). The district code is DC26. It is part of a larger historical area also known as Zululand.

Geography

Neighbours
Zululand is surrounded by:
 Amajuba to the north-west (DC25)
 Gert Sibande in Mpumalanga to the north (DC30)
 The kingdom of Eswatini to the north
 Umkhanyakude to the east (DC27)
 Umzinyathi to the south-west (DC24)
 uThungulu to the south (DC28)

Local municipalities
The district contains the following local municipalities:

Demographics
The following statistics are from the 2001 census.

Gender

Ethnic group

Age

Politics

Election results
Election results for Zululand in the South African general election, 2004. 
 Population 18 and over: 394 233 [49.01% of total population] 
 Total votes: 218 270 [27.13% of total population] 
 Voting % estimate: 55.37% votes as a % of population 18 and over

See also
 Municipal Demarcation Board

References

External links 
 

District Municipalities of KwaZulu-Natal
Zululand District Municipality